Lieutenant General Douglas Mackinnon Baillie Hamilton Cochrane, 12th Earl of Dundonald,  (29 October 1852 – 12 April 1935), styled Lord Cochrane between 1860 and 1885, was a Scottish representative peer and a British Army general.

Early life
Cochrane was the second but eldest surviving son of Thomas Cochrane, 11th Earl of Dundonald, by Louisa Harriet Mackinnon, daughter of William Alexander Mackinnon. Thomas Cochrane, 1st Baron Cochrane of Cults, was his younger brother. He was educated at Eton College.

Military career

Cochrane was commissioned into the Life Guards in July 1870, and was promoted to lieutenant the following year and captain in 1878. He served in the Nile Expedition, the Desert March and the Relief of Khartoum in 1885. He was appointed Commanding Officer of 2nd Life Guards in 1895.

He served in the Second Boer War and in November 1899 he was appointed Commander of the Mounted Brigade, part of the South Natal Field Force. He took part in the Relief of Ladysmith in February 1900, although his South African troops, unimpressed by his leadership, referred to him as "Dundoodle".

In April 1902, it was announced that Lord Dundonald would be appointed General Officer Commanding the Militia of Canada, the senior military officer in Canada. He left Liverpool on 15 July, and arrived in Quebec and Ottawa later the same month to take up his position. He and his family stayed at Crichton Lodge in Rockcliffe, Ottawa. during his time at Canada, he was able to change the dress codes of many Scottish regiments to align more with their culture. He served in Canada for two years until he was dismissed by the dominion cabinet due to his outburst at a dinner in Montreal, described as "utterances at a banquet" in newspaper articles and officially termed "Indiscretion and insubordination" by the cabinet.
In defence of his critics, Dundonald asserted that communication between him and the minister of the militia had been corrupted which left Canada defenceless.

In 1910, Douglas was appointed the first 'gold stick in waiting' for king George V, and on arrival of Theodore Roosevelt, he was the king's 'aide de camp'.

He later served in the First World War as Chairman of the Admiralty Committee on Smoke Screens in 1915.

Inventions
A list of his inventions that were patented;

- 'Pocket-stove', (Patented 25 August 1896)

- 'Carriage and Traction Arrangement for a Machine or Quick Firing Gun', (Patented 18 August 1896)

- 'An Improvement in Nosebags for Horses', (Patented 7 September 1896)

- 'Improvements in Horse Traction Arrangements for Vehicles', (Patented 1 May 1897)

- 'Improvements in Ambulances and other Vehicles, especially adapted for Camel Traction', (patented 3 September 1897)

- 'Ammunition holder for machine guns', (Patented 19 July, I898)

- 'Bicycle saddle'; A Yielding Seat applicable in lieu of Saddle, (Patented 6 September, I898)

- 'Apparatus for Mechanical Patrontilførlsen by Guardian'; cartridge supply, (Patented 2 February 1899)

- 'Improvements in the Coupling and Traction of Bicycles', (Patented 18 February 1899)

- 'Tea or Coffee pot'; which was later manufactured as a teapot by the Wedgwood company, and marketed as the "SYP" (Simple Yet Perfect). Later, in 1911 a licence to manufacture 'S.Y.P. teapots and coffee pots' was applied for with James Dixon & Sons.
(Patented 16 July 1901)

Personal life

Lord Dundonald married Winifred Bamford-Hesketh, daughter of Robert Bamford-Hesketh, in 1878. For many years, the family lived at Gwrych Castle in North Wales, the seat of the Bamford-Hesketh family. The Countess of Dundonald did not accompany her husband to Canada. They had two sons and three daughters:

 Lady Grizel Winifred Louisa Cochrane (1880–1976), who married Lt.-Col. Hon. Ralph Gerard Alexander Hamilton, Master of Belhaven (1883–1918), only son of Alexander Hamilton, 10th Lord Belhaven and Stenton, in 1904. He was killed during the Battle of Amiens.
 Thomas Hesketh Douglas Blair Cochrane, 13th Earl of Dundonald (1886–1958), a Capt. of the Scots Guards who served as a Representative Peer for Scotland from 1941 to 1955.
 Lady Jean Alice Elaine Cochrane (1887–1955), who married Herbert Hervey, 5th Marquess of Bristol in 1914. They divorced in 1933 and she married Capt. Sir Peter Drummond MacDonald, a son of Ronald MacDonald, in December 1933.
 Lady Marjorie Gwendoline Elsie Cochrane (b. 1889), who married Owsley Vincent Fydell Rowley, eldest son of George Fydell Rowley in 1917. They divorced in 1932.
 Hon. Douglas Robert Hesketh Roger Cochrane (1893–1942), who married Enid Marion Davis, a daughter of Miles Leonard Davies, in 1918.

His wife died in January 1924. Lord Dundonald died at his home in Wimbledon in April 1935, aged 82, and was succeeded in the earldom by his eldest son, Thomas. He is buried in Achnaba Churchyard, Ardchattan near Benderloch, Lorne, Argyll & Bute. As his eldest son died unmarried and without issue, he was succeeded by his nephew, Ian Douglas Leonard Cochrane as the 14th Earl of Dundonald.

Honours and legacy
Lord Dundonald was appointed a Commander of the Royal Victorian Order (CVO) in December 1901, and in June 1907 knighted as a Knight Commander (KCVO) of the order.

Dundonald Park, in Centretown, Ottawa, is named after him.

See also
Earl of Dundonald
Clan Cochrane

References

Books Used for Citations

 

British Army lieutenant generals
Canadian generals
12
Scottish representative peers
1852 births
1935 deaths
British Life Guards officers
British Army personnel of the Mahdist War
British Army personnel of the Second Boer War
British Army personnel of World War I
Commanders of the Canadian Army
Knights Commander of the Order of the Bath
Knights Commander of the Order of St Michael and St George
People educated at Eton College
Douglas